Cape Wrath Lighthouse at Cape Wrath was built in 1828 by Robert Stevenson and was manned until 1998, when it was converted to automatic operation by the Northern Lighthouse Board. It is located at the most North-Westerly point on the British mainland, in the traditional county of Sutherland within Highland Region.

Overlooking the Cape are the ruins of the Lloyd's signal station, which was used to monitor shipping and was built in the 19th century.

History
The lighthouse was built in 1828. Due to its height the light was often obscured by low cloud or fog and in the early 20th century plans were drawn up to build an additional low light. This involved the construction of tunnels into the headland, bridges and building on the very tip of the rocks below the headland. Plans were drawn up by David Alan Stevenson, Robert's grandson and work began in 1913 but was suspended at the start of World War I and never restarted.

The light was originally a paraffin lamp with red and white reflectors. This was replaced by mercury vapour lamps in 1978 and in 1980 an electrical temporary power beam was installed with a gear less pedestal and array system later in the same year.  The fog-horn at the site was discontinued in 2001.

Current display
The optics are a first order Fresnel lens and the light has a power rating of 200,000 candela.

Buildings and access routes
A number of lighthouse keepers cottages and store buildings are located near to the lighthouse, with the complex surrounded by a perimeter wall. The lighthouse and its associated buildings are designated as a Category A listed building. Much of the material for the lighthouse was quarried locally during construction, particularly from Clais Charnach.

A complex of buildings was built close to the lighthouse by Lloyd's of London as a signal station between 1894 and 1903. These buildings, which are Category B listed buildings, form one of the few remaining sites of Lloyds signal stations in the UK. The signal station was built to track shipping around Cape Wrath and was closed in 1932, although the site was reused in 1939 as an observation post at the outbreak of World War II. A new coastguard station was built next to the signalling station in the 1940s for wartime use. The signal station and coastguard station buildings are largely derelict.

This was used during the building of the lighthouse to supply materials along a rough road and was the main landing point for supplies and stores during the manned operation of the lighthouse, although from 1977 onwards helicopters were also used for resupply. Store buildings were constructed at the same time, one of which is still in use by the Ministry of Defence. The slipway was extended and rebuilt in around 1863 and remains in use as a landing site for the lighthouse. The access road from the Kyle of Durness was built to support the lighthouse in 1828.

The lighthouse is now considered to be the end of the Cape Wrath Trail, an approximately 200 mile long very rugged walking trail from Fort William.

See also

 List of lighthouses in Scotland
 List of Northern Lighthouse Board lighthouses

References

External links

 Northern Lighthouse Board

Lighthouses completed in 1828
Category A listed lighthouses
Category A listed buildings in Highland (council area)
Parish of Durness
Works of Robert Stevenson (civil engineer)